Mizan (Ottoman Turkish: Balance) was an Ottoman newspaper which existed in the period 1886–1909 with some interruptions. The paper was published in different cities, including Istanbul, Cairo, Paris and Geneva. It was one of the official media outlets of the Committee of Union and Progress.

History and profile
Mizan was launched by Mehmed Murad in Istanbul in 1886 as a weekly newspaper. Due to the popularity of the paper he became known as Mizancı Murad who was one of the leaders of Young Turks.

The first issue of Mizan appeared on 21 August 1886, and the paper was based in Istanbul until 11 December 1890. After six-year hiatus Mizan was restarted in Cairo on 21 January 1898. The Ottoman Sultan asked Khedive Abbas Hilmi to arrest Mizancı Murad and to close down Mizan. Although the demands of the Sultan were rejected, the paper could stay in Egypt only until 8 July 1896. In Cairo Mizan was published by the Committee of Union and Progress weekly on Thursdays. The license of the paper was held by Mehmed Murad Enveri, and the managers were Abdullah Ilmi and Dr. Lutfi. 

The paper was restarted in Paris and published there between 14 December 1896 and 3 May 1897. Next it appeared in Geneva between 10 May and 19 July 1897. It was relaunched on 30 July 1908 in Istanbul, but it ceased publication with the last issue dated 14 April 1909. The reason for its closure was that Mizancı Murat was arrested and sent to exile due to his alleged role in the coup against the Committee of Union and Progress in 1909.

Mizan adopted a critical approach towards the Ottoman Sultan and grand viziers which led to Mizancı Murad's exile in different countries and to the publication of the paper in different cities. While being published in Cairo, the paper was financed by Khedive Abbas Hilmi, and had higher circulation levels both in Istanbul and Yemen.

References

1886 establishments in the Ottoman Empire
1909 disestablishments in the Ottoman Empire
Committee of Union and Progress
Defunct newspapers published in the Ottoman Empire
Newspapers published in Geneva
Newspapers published in Cairo
Newspapers published in Istanbul
Newspapers published in Paris
Publications established in 1886
Publications disestablished in 1909
Turkish-language newspapers
Weekly newspapers published in France
Weekly newspapers published in Egypt
Weekly newspapers published in Switzerland